Sarah Maria Taylor (born January 7, 1974) is an American singer-songwriter. Taylor is the daughter of Carly Simon and James Taylor, and the sister of musician Ben Taylor. In addition to her solo career, Taylor is a former member of the indie band The Slip.

Taylor is also a philanthropist, who works towards addressing the problem of land mines in Southeast Asia.

Touring band
From 1999 to 2002, Taylor's touring band consisted of a core group of musicians, most of whom also contributed to the recordings. The key members were:

Kenny Castro – bass
Kyle Comerford – drums/smiles (2000–2001)
Brian McRae – drums (1999–2000)
Dean Oldencott – drums (2001–2002)
Chris Soucy – guitars, vocals
In 2006, Taylor toured with her brother Ben and crew, in February and March.

Activism
In addition to her musical career, Taylor is an advocate for the victims of land mines. To this end, she founded "The Tranquility Project" with her husband Dean Bragonier. The charity endeavors to remove landmines from Southeast Asia, raise awareness of the issues, and to assist victims to regain their lives and provide hope. She appears on a CD, Too Many Years, to benefit Clear Path International's work with land mine survivors. In 2007, Taylor hosted a charity concert in her home of Boulder, Colorado with singer-songwriter Wendy Woo and the band Something Underground, made up of brothers Seth and Josh Larson. Taylor has joined the band in the last few years, traveling through the Midwest and all the way to Southeast Asia twice, performing charity concerts.

Taylor, who is vegan, converted a Volkswagen van, called "Sally in the Raw", into a food cart featuring vegan and raw foods.

Personal life
Taylor is married to Dean Bragonier. On October 4, 2007 she gave birth to a son, Bodhi Taylor Bragonier.  Both she and her husband have been diagnosed with dyslexia. Her son Bodhi, also has dyslexia and has been the inspiration behind the need to help fund other families with similar NoticeAbility diagnosis. 
 
As the daughter of singer-songwriters James Taylor and Carly Simon, her birth was mentioned in the song "Sarah Maria", on James Taylor's 1975 album Gorilla. Carly Simon's Hotcakes album, released in January 1974, contains a song called "Think I'm Gonna Have a Baby", and the cover photo is a study of a pregnant Simon.

Taylor graduated from Tabor Academy, a college-preparatory boarding school in Marion, Massachusetts. She attended Brown University, studying medical anthropology.

Discography
 Tomboy Bride (1999) Produced by Sally Taylor and Wendy Woo
 Apt. #6S (2000), What Are Records?
 Shotgun (2001)

References

External links
 Official web site
 The Tranquility Project

1974 births
Living people
American people of German-Jewish descent
American people of Cuban descent
American people of Scottish descent
American people of Swiss-German descent
American people of Spanish descent
Place of birth missing (living people)
The Slip (band) members
James Taylor
Taylor family (show business)
Carly Simon
Tabor Academy (Massachusetts) alumni
Brown University alumni
American folk singers
American women guitarists
American folk guitarists
American acoustic guitarists
American singer-songwriters
21st-century American singers
21st-century American women singers
Simon family (publishing)